The white-throated caracara or Darwin's caracara (Phalcoboenus albogularis) is a species of bird of prey in the family Falconidae, the falcons and caracaras. It is found in Argentina and Chile.

Taxonomy and systematics

The white-throated caracara is a member of order Falconiformes, which different taxonomic systems assign 65 or 66 species; 10, 11 or 12 genera; and two or three subfamilies. The caracaras contributes the most to the differences. The American Ornithological Society, the International Ornithological Committee, and BirdLife International's Handbook of the Birds of the World place the white-throated caracara in genus Phalcoboenus. The Clements taxonomy places it in genus Daptrius. The four systems differ on the genera of several other caracaras as well.

The white-throated caracara and the carunculated caracara (P. carunculatus) were formerly treated as subspecies of the mountain caracara (P. megalopterus) but the three are now considered a superspecies due to their shallow genetic differences. Possible hybrids between the white-throated and mountain caracaras have been reported but not widely accepted.

Taxonomic systems agree that the white-throated caracara is monotypic.

Description

It has a small crest, long wings with clear "fingers" on the tips, and a long rounded tail. The sexes' plumages are alike. Adults' upperparts are mostly brownish black to black with white uppertail coverts. Their underparts and tips of the tail feathers are pure unmarked white. The undersides of their primaries have black and white bands at their base. Their bare facial skin is yellow-orange, their iris is hazel to brown, and their legs and feet yellow. Juveniles have dark brown upperparts and bluish white facial skin, legs, and feet.

Distribution and habitat

The white-throated caracara is the southernmost member of the "mountain caracara" superspecies. It is found from south-central Chile's Los Lagos Region and western Argentina's Mendoza Province south to Tierra del Fuego and Cape Horn. It inhabits open mountain slopes, southern beech (Nothofagus) forest, open woodland, and dense scrublands.

Behavior

Movement

The white-throated caracara's movements are imperfectly known; the species is thought to be somewhat nomadic.

Feeding

Information is sparse on the white-throated caracara's diet and foraging behavior. It is known to feed on carrion, for instance dead guanaco (Lama guanicoe) and cattle, and has also been documented preying on small rodents. Small numbers gather with vultures at carcasses and with other caracara species at sheep slaughter, and it will attempt to drive off its competitors. It is thought to seek food while in flight rather than walking on the ground like some other caracaras.

Breeding

Little is known about the white-throated caracara's breeding biology. It builds a stick nest on a rock ledge. Its clutch of two or three eggs is probably laid in October-November. The incubation period, time to fledging, and details of parental care are not known.

Vocalization

As of early 2023, xeno-canto and the Cornell Lab of Ornithology's Macaulay Library each had only two recordings of white-throated caracara vocalizations. "The call is said to be a deeper version of that of Chimango" but the chimango caracara has "far more peevish whinings".

Status

The IUCN has assessed the white-throated caracara as being of Least Concern. Though it has a restricted range and an estimated population of fewer than 6700 mature individuals, the latter is believed to be stable. No immediate threats have been identified. It is said to be common in Nothofagus forest, and occurs in at least three national parks. "Habitat not subject to much disturbance, and no persecution reported, so presumably not a species of immediate concern."

References

Further reading
 Jaramillo, Alvaro, Burke, Peter, & Beadle, David (2003). Birds of Chile. Christopher Helm, London. .

white-throated caracara
Birds of Chile
Birds of the Southern Andes
Birds of Patagonia
Birds of Tierra del Fuego
white-throated caracara
Taxonomy articles created by Polbot